Tingena brachyacma is a species of moth in the family Oecophoridae. It is endemic to New Zealand and has been found in the south of the South Island. This species inhabits open swamps, native forest and scrubland and has been collected amongst Leptospermum. The adults of the species are on the wing in November and December.

Taxonomy 
This species was first described by Edward Meyrick in 1909 using a specimen collected by Alfred Philpott in October in Invercargill and named Borkhausenia brachyacma. George Hudson discussed and illustrated this species in his 1928 book The butterflies and moths of New Zealand also under the name B. brachyacma.  In 1988 John S. Dugdale assigned this species to the genus Tingena. In the same publication Dugdale also synonymised Borkhausenia amnopis with this species. The male holotype specimen is held at the Natural History Museum, London.

Description 

Meyrick described the species as follows:
This species is similar in appearance to T. innotella but can be distinguished by its large brown discal spot. Also the terminal joint of its palpi is very short and its antennae are pubescent ciliated.

Distribution
This species is endemic to New Zealand. Other than the type locality of Invercargill, this species has also been collected at Waipori River and at Woodhaugh in Dunedin.

Behaviour 
Adults of this species are on the wing in November and December.

Habitat 
This species is associated with Leptospermum and prefers the habitat of open swamps, native forests and scrubland.

References

Oecophoridae
Moths of New Zealand
Moths described in 1909
Endemic fauna of New Zealand
Taxa named by Edward Meyrick
Endemic moths of New Zealand